Svetlana Kitić (born 19 June 1960) is a Bosnian Serb retired professional handball player who competed at the 1980 and 1984 Summer Olympics for Yugoslavia, and was part of the Bosnia and Herzegovina national team in the early 2000s. In 2010, she was voted the best female handball player ever by the IHF.

Biography
Kitić was born in Tuzla, later in her career she returned to Bosnia and Herzegovina after the war, and simultaneously coached and played for Sarajevo based handball club Željezničar and later for Jedinstvo, club from her hometown Tuzla and where she started professional career in handball as 16-year-old girl.  Moreover, she played together with her eldest daughter Mara Bogunović on Jedinstvo's first team. In 2002, she entered Bosnian women's national handball team which took part in qualifications for 2003 World Championship in Zagreb. Bosnia with Kitić reached the barrage but failed to qualify. After that Kitić took the role of Director of Bosnian women's national handball team and served between 2006 and 2008.

She last played for Radnički in Belgrade, Serbia.

In 1980 she won the silver medal with the Yugoslav team. She played all five matches and scored 29 goals. Four years later she won the gold medal as member of the Yugoslav team. She played all five matches and scored 22 goals. In all her representative career she played 202 matches and scored the incredible number of 911 goals. She was voted World Player of the Year 1988 by the International Handball Federation.

Awards

She won the Oscar Of Popularity for the year 2010 in Serbia.

Personal life
At the age of 19, Kitić married a former Bosnian football player Blaž Slišković, they divorced after four months.  She later married handball player Dragan Dašić in 1982, but divorced him after four years of marriage. In 1988, she married  manager Goran Bogunović with whom she has a daughter Mara, they split  in 1990.  Kitić is a mother of three adult children. She resides in Belgrade with her family.

Honours

Player
Radnički Belgrade
Yugoslav Women's Handball Championship: 1981, 1982, 1983, 1984, 1986, 1987
Yugoslav Women's Handball Cup: 1983, 1985, 1986, 1990, 1991, 1992
Women's EHF Champions League: 1975–76, 1979–80, 1983–84
Women's EHF Cup Winners' Cup: 1985–86, 1990–91, 1990–91, 1991–92

Yugoslavia Youth
IHF Women's Junior World Championship: 1977, third-place 1979

Yugoslavia
Summer Olympics: runner-up 1980, 1984
IHF World Women's Handball Championship: runner-up 1990
Mediterranean Games: 1979

References

External links
profile

1960 births
Living people
Sportspeople from Tuzla
Serbs of Bosnia and Herzegovina
Bosnia and Herzegovina sports executives and administrators
Yugoslav female handball players
Handball players at the 1980 Summer Olympics
Handball players at the 1984 Summer Olympics
Olympic handball players of Yugoslavia
Olympic gold medalists for Yugoslavia
Olympic silver medalists for Yugoslavia
Olympic medalists in handball
Medalists at the 1984 Summer Olympics
Medalists at the 1980 Summer Olympics
Mediterranean Games gold medalists for Yugoslavia
Competitors at the 1979 Mediterranean Games
Parovi
Mediterranean Games medalists in handball